Barumun River is a Sumatran river that begins in Siraisan, Padang Lawas Regency in the southeastern North Sumatra, Indonesia, about 1200 km northwest of the capital Jakarta.

Hydrology 
The river flows northward through North Padang Lawas, South and Labuhan Batu Regency before it reaches Sumatra east coast with its estuary in Malacca Strait.

The largest city on the Barumun is Kotapinang, South Labuhan Batu, with a population of 54.000 people. While the largest city in the Barumun basin is Rantau Prapat, which is located on the Bilah with a population of 164.000 people. It is the largest river in Sumatra with length at about 440 km.

Tributaries include the Bilah, Kanan, Batang Pane, Sihapas and Aek Sangkilon. All tributaries of Barumun River are sourced from mountainous areas along Barisan Mountains.

Geography
The river flows in the northern area of Sumatra with predominantly tropical rainforest climate (designated as Af in the Köppen-Geiger climate classification). The annual average temperature in the area is 23 °C. The warmest month is May, when the average temperature is around 25 °C, and the coldest is January, at 22 °C. The average annual rainfall is 2801 mm. The wettest month is November, with an average of 381 mm rainfall, and the driest is March, with 126 mm rainfall.

See also 
List of rivers of Indonesia
List of rivers of Sumatra

References

Rivers of North Sumatra
Rivers of Indonesia